S26 is a line on the Berlin S-Bahn. It runs from Teltow in the district (Kreis) of Potsdam-Mittelmark via Südkreuz, through the Berlin Nord-Süd Tunnel with a stop at Friedrichstraße, and ends in Waidmannslust in the borough of Reinickendorf. On weekends the S26 runs from Teltow to Potsdamer Platz.

Trains on this line run every 20 minutes. This interval is in sections shortened to a 10-minute interval by the S25. There is no night service on this line.

History

One line, three routes
This line number is used by the Berlin S-Bahn for temporary routings required during major construction works. As a consequence, the line has existed with three different routes since its inception in May 1995. This line ran between Lichterfelde Ost and Waidmannslust from May until October 1995. The line then ran between Lichterfelde Süd and Birkenwerder from September 2001 until June 2003. The most recent version of the line ran between Teltow Stadt and Potsdamer Platz (latterly Nordbahnhof) from February 2005 until May 2006.

S26 in 1995
The S26 line ran between Lichterfelde Ost and Waidmannslust from the 28 May 1995. The line only lasted five months with the service revision of 15 October 1995 rendering the service obsolete – the S25 served most of the line and the S2 was extended from Nordbahnhof to Waidmannslust. The station listing below provides an overview of what the line looked like. The possible travel connections are correct for the period of operation and do not reflect the current travel connections for these stations.

 Lichterfelde Ost (S25)
 Lankwitz
 Südende
 Priesterweg (S2)
 Papestraße (S45) (S46)
 Yorckstraße (S1) (U7)
 Anhalter Bahnhof
 Potsdamer Platz (U2)
 Unter den Linden
 Friedrichstraße (S3) (S5) (S7) (S75) (S9) (U6)
 Oranienburger Straße
 Nordbahnhof (S2)
 Humboldthain
 Gesundbrunnen (U8)
 Bornholmer Straße (S8) (S10)
 Wollankstraße
 Schönholz (S25)
 Wilhelmsruh
 Wittenau (U8)
 Waidmannslust (S1)

From Lichterfelde Süd to Birkenwerder
The S26 line ran between Lichterfelde Süd and Birkenwerder from 16 September 2001. This time, the line was required to maintain service on the outer railway ring to Birkenwerder during reconstruction work on the Nordring between Schönhauser Allee and Bornholmer Straße after the fall of the Berlin Wall. The line lasted until construction work was completed in June 2003. After this date, line S8 was able to continue to Birkenwerder from the East ring, and the line was once again obsolete. However, the line did not operate the whole distance of the line for the 21 months of operation. Instead, the line operated in two phases from June to October 2002 due to construction works in the North-South Tunnel: from Lichterfelde Süd to Papestraße and from Nordbahnhof to Birkenwerder. The station listing below provides an overview of what the whole line looked like. The possible travel connections are correct for the period of operation and do not reflect the current travel connections for these stations.

 Lichterfelde Süd (S25)
 Osdorfer Straße 
 Lichterfelde Ost 
 Lankwitz
 Südende
 Priesterweg (S2)
 Papestraße (S4) (S45) (S46)
 Yorckstraße (S1) (U7)
 Anhalter Bahnhof
 Potsdamer Platz (U2)
 Unter den Linden
 Friedrichstraße (S3) (S5) (S7) (S75) (S9) (U6)
 Oranienburger Straße
 Nordbahnhof 
 Humboldthain
 Gesundbrunnen (S4) (S8) (U8)
 Bornholmer Straße (S1) (S25)
 Pankow (U2)
 Pankow-Heinersdorf
 Blankenburg (S2)
 Mühlenbeck-Mönchmühle
 Schönfließ
 Bergfelde
 Hohen Neuendorf (S1)
 Birkenwerder (S1)

Teltow Stadt Shuttle
The S26 was re-introduced to the Berlin S-Bahn network on 25 February 2005 with the opening of Teltow Stadt station. Due to signalling works in the North-South Tunnel, the line operated as a substitute route for the south part of the S25 as far as Potsdamer Platz. When the signalling works were completed on 8 May 2006, the line was extended as far as Nordbahnhof. For three weeks, S26 trains continued as the S86 to Birkenwerder, thereby producing a direct connection between Teltow Stadt and Birkenwerder. Upon the timetable change of 28 May 2006, the S25 was re-established to Teltow Stadt and the S26 was once again removed from the network. The station listing below provides an overview of what the line looked like. The possible travel connections are correct for the period of operation and do not reflect the current travel connections for these stations.

 Teltow Stadt
 Lichterfelde Süd
 Osdorfer Straße 
 Lichterfelde Ost 
 Lankwitz
 Südende
 Priesterweg (S2)
 Papestraße (S41) (S42) (S45) (S46) (S47)
 Yorckstraße (S1) (U7)
 Anhalter Bahnhof
 Potsdamer Platz (U2)

From 8 May 2006 until 27 May 2006, additional stops were added at:
 Unter den Linden
 Friedrichstraße (S5) (S7) (S75) (S9) (U6)
 Oranienburger Straße
 Nordbahnhof (S86)

2017 Restoration
The S26 has been reopened on 10 December 2017 after restoration, as a result of the completion of the connection between the Stadtbahn and Ringbahn at Ostkreuz. 
 Teltow Stadt (S25)
 Lichterfelde Süd
 Osdorfer Straße 
 Lichterfelde Ost 
 Lankwitz
 Südende
 Priesterweg (S2)
 Südkreuz (S41) (S42) (S45) (S46)
 Yorckstraße (S1) (U7)
 Anhalter Bahnhof
 Potsdamer Platz 
 Brandenburger Tor
 Friedrichstraße (S3) (S5) (S7) (S9) (U6)
 Oranienburger Straße
 Nordbahnhof 
 Humboldthain
 Gesundbrunnen (S41) (S42) (U8)
 Bornholmer Straße (S2) (S8) (S85)
 Wollankstraße
 Schönholz (S25)
 Wilhelmsruh
 Wittenau (U8)
 Waidmannslust (S1)

References

External links
  Berliner Verkehr Netzspinnen, Line Maps for every routing of the S26.
  S-Bahn Berlin News Release, News Release promoting Teltow Stadt to Birkenwerder routing without changing in May 2006 from March 2006.

Berlin S-Bahn lines